"Brown Skin" is the second single released by American soul and R&B singer-songwriter India.Arie from her debut studio album Acoustic Soul in 2001. The single failed to chart on the Billboard Hot 100, but it became her highest charting single in the United Kingdom, peaking at number 29.

Dance Remixes CD Single Track listing:

"Brown Skin" (E-London Radio Mix) – 4:04
"Brown Skin" (E-London Club Mix) – 8:29
"Brown Skin" (E-London Instrumental) – 8:28
"Brown Skin" (illicit Radio Mix) – 3:57
"Brown Skin" (Illicit Club Mix) – 8:24
"Brown Skin" (Illicit Instrumental) – 8:24

Charts

Release history

References 

2001 singles
2001 songs
India Arie songs
Motown singles
Songs written by India Arie
Songs written by Mark Batson
Songs written by Shannon Sanders
Song recordings produced by Mark Batson